The Armenian Cycling Federation (Armenian: Հայաստանի հեծանվային մարզաձևերի ֆեդերացիա) is the national governing body of cycle racing in Armenia. It is a member of the International Cycling Union and the European Cycling Union.

The federation operates the Yerevan Velodrome, where its headquarters are located. Armenian track cyclist Edgar Stepanyan competed successfully at the 2015 and 2018 European Track Championships, where he won two gold medals at the junior and under-23 level.

See also 

 Sport in Armenia

References

External links 
 Armenian Cycling Federation on Facebook

Armenia
Armenia
Cycle sport
Cycle racing organizations
Cycling
Cycle racing in Armenia